The Channel Islands are a group of British islands in the English Channel.

Other uses of Channel Island or Channel Islands include:
Channel Island, Northern Territory, an island and industrial suburb in Darwin
Channel Island Power Station
Channel Island Conservation Reserve
Channel Islands (California), an eight-island archipelago off the coast of southern California
Channel Islands National Park
Channel Islands National Marine Sanctuary
Chausey, a group of French islands in the English Channel